Mark Mallia is a painter and sculptor from Malta.

Mark Mallia may also refer to:

 Mark Mallia, an alleged gang member involved in the Melbourne gangland killings